Defence Raya Golf and Country Club (DRGCC) is a Golf resort in DHA, Lahore, Pakistan. It is owned by the DHA and established as a joint venture between BRDB, a Malaysian company and DHA Lahore to provide a facility for its members.

Organisation

 The club is run under an expert and professional management having staff from home and abroad. 

Facilities

See also 
 List of sports venues in Lahore

References

External links 
 DRGCC's official website

Defence, Lahore
Golf clubs and courses in Pakistan
Sports venues in Lahore